Garizat Rural District is in Garizat District of Taft County, Yazd province, Iran. At the National Census of 2006, its population was 5,558 in 1,538 households, when it was in Nir District. There were 5,550 inhabitants in 1,697 households at the following census of 2011, by which time it was in the newly formed Garizat District. At the most recent census of 2016, the population of the rural district was 3,933 in 1,377 households. The largest of its 84 villages was Bakh, with 718 people.

References 

Taft County

Rural Districts of Yazd Province

Populated places in Yazd Province

Populated places in Taft County